Beth Elaine Mooney (born 1955) is an American financial executive who is the first woman to be CEO of a top-20 U.S. bank. On May 1, 2011 KeyCorp named Mooney its chairwoman and chief executive officer of the Cleveland, Ohio-based bank.  From November 2010 until May 1, 2011 she was the president and the chief operating officer at KeyCorp.

Early life and education

Mooney was born in 1955 as Beth Elaine Streeter and was raised in Midland, Michigan, as her father was a chemist for Dow Chemical while her mother was an English teacher. She was the youngest of three children in the family.
 
She earned a BA in history from the University of Texas at Austin. In 1977, she got a job in the real estate department of First City National Bank of Houston. She worked there as a bank secretary until 1979, when she got a job on Republic Bank of Dallas' management training program, after refusing to leave training manager Keith Schmidt's office until he employed her.

Mooney earned an MBA from Southern Methodist University in 1983.

Career

In 16 years, Mooney performed in various roles in the banking industry, such as commercial and real estate lending and chief financial officer. Mooney served as Regional President of Bank One in Akron and Dayton. She served as president from June 1999 until June 2000 of Bank One Ohio, NA.

She was Chief Operating Officer from June 1998 until June 1999 of DPL Inc, a public utility.

From June 2000 until February 2004 Mooney served as Group Head of Tennessee and North Louisiana Banking Group.

In 2004 she left Nashville to become the CFO of AmSouth.

From February 2004 until April 4, 2006 she was the CFO and head of the finance group of Regions Financial Corporation in Birmingham, Alabama (which was formerly known as AmSouth Bancorp and AmSouth Bancorporation) and its subsidiary AmSouth bank.

In April 2006 Mooney joined KeyCorp as a Vice Chair and head of Key Community Bank. In November 2010 until May 1, 2011 she served as president and Chief Operation Officer at KeyCorp.

On May 1, 2011 Mooney became CEO and chairwoman of KeyCorp. In September 2019, Mooney announced her retirement from Key Corp., effective May 2020.

In March 2019, Mooney was named the chair-elect of Cleveland Clinic's Board of Directors.

See also
List of chief executive officers

References

1955 births
American women chief executives
Southern Methodist University alumni
University of Texas at Austin College of Liberal Arts alumni
21st-century American businesspeople
People from Midland, Michigan
American chief executives of financial services companies
Living people
American chief operating officers
American chief financial officers
American chief executives of Fortune 500 companies
21st-century American businesswomen